The Zygos Citizens Movement is a political party which encourages problem solving by technically minded people such as engineers, scientists and doctors as opposed to lawyers and politicians.

References

External links 
 Zygos website

Political parties in Cyprus